Qanat-e Mir Qalandar (also Romanized as Qanāt-e Mīr Qalandar; also known as Mīr Qalandar) is a village in Kahnuk Rural District, Irandegan District, Khash County, Sistan and Baluchestan Province, Iran. At the 2006 census, its population was 407, in 83 families.

References 

Populated places in Khash County